Andrew Bailey may refer to:

 Andrew Bailey (banker) (born 1959), British banker, Governor of the Bank of England
 Andrew Bailey (baseball) (born 1984), American baseball pitcher
 Andrew Bailey (performance artist) (born 1947), British performance artist and comedian
 Andrew Bailey (politician), Missouri Attorney General since November 2022